Francis Reynolds may refer to:
 Francis A. Reynolds (died 1970), American college athletics administrator
 Francis Reynolds-Moreton, 3rd Baron Ducie (1739–1808), British naval officer
 Francis Reynolds (priest) (died 1852), Archdeacon of Bombay
 Francis Esmond Reynolds (1882–1967), British pathologist and medical author
 Francis Reynolds (law professor) (born 1932), professor of law at the University of Oxford